Antônio Ribeiro de Oliveira (Orizona, June 6, 1926 – Goiania, February 28, 2017) was a Brazilian Roman Catholic Archbishop.

Ordained to the priesthood in 1949, Ribeiro de Oliveira served as bishop of the Diocese of Ipameri Brazil, from 1975 to 1985. He had served as auxiliary bishop of the Archdiocese of Goiânia from 1961 to 1975 and then as archbishop of the archdiocese from 1985 to 2002.

Notes

1926 births
2017 deaths
21st-century Roman Catholic archbishops in Brazil
20th-century Roman Catholic archbishops in Brazil
Roman Catholic archbishops of Goiânia
Roman Catholic bishops of Goiânia
Roman Catholic bishops of Ipameri